Decameron Nights is a 1953 anthology Technicolor film based on three tales from The Decameron by Giovanni Boccaccio, specifically the ninth and tenth tales of the second day and the ninth tale of the third. It stars Joan Fontaine and, as Boccaccio, Louis Jourdan.

Plot
In the mid-fourteenth century, Boccaccio seeks his true love, the recently widowed Fiametta (Joan Fontaine), and finds that she has fled Florence, plague-ridden and being sacked by an invading army, for a villa in the countryside with several female companions. When he shows up, Fiametta does not want to invite him to stay, but her friends, bored and lacking male companionship, override her. To entertain the ladies (and further his courtship of Fiametta), Boccaccio tells stories of the pursuit of love.

Bartolomea (Fontaine) is frustrated by her marriage to the wealthy, much older Ricciardo (Godfrey Tearle). The latter's strong belief in astrology dictates how they live. One day, the stars are favorable for fishing, but pirates capture the ladies. Their captain, Paganino (Jourdan), releases all but Bartolomea. He demand a 50,000 gold florin ransom to be paid at Majorca. By the time Ricciardo shows up, however, Bartolomea has fallen in love with the pirate. She denies knowing Ricciardo and, when he is unable to answer a simple question about her, Paganino's friend, the Governor of Majorca (Eliot Makeham), orders Ricciardo to pay a fine for his lies: 50,000 florins. Paganino and Bartolomea get married, and he promises to give up piracy.

Fiametta is not amused by the "moral" of the story, but the others beg Boccaccio for another. Instead, Fiametta decides to recount a more uplifting tale, to her friends' disappointment.

Giulio (Jourdan) goads Bernabo (Tearle) into betting on the virtue of his wife Ginevra (Fontaine). Giulio wagers that he can seduce Ginevra within a month. However, Giulio merely bribes the woman's maid Nerina (Binnie Barnes) into letting him hide in her mistress's bedchamber. Later, while Ginevra sleeps, he steals her locket and cuts off a lock of her hair, noticing as he does so a birthmark on her shoulder. When Giulio provides all three as "proof", Bernabo pays up. He then recruits two assassins to do away with his wife. The killers are discomfited by Ginevra's lack of fear and let her go.

She disguises herself as a man and becomes a sailor on a merchant ship. A potential customer, the Sultan (Meinhart Maur), becomes fascinated by Ginevra's pet talking parrot and agrees to buy the merchant's wares if he can also have the bird. Since the parrot will only speak for Ginevra, she agrees to enter the Sultan's service.

Then one day, she spots her locket in a marketplace stall manned by Giulio. Still in disguise, she coaxes the story out of him and finally learns why her husband wanted her dead. She has the Sultan invite both Giulio and Bernabo to dinner. Later, with Bernabo within earshot but out of sight, she appears dressed as a woman and asks Giulio if he knows her. When he repeatedly denies it, she is vindicated, and reunited with her husband.

Boccaccio does not like the tale, and starts another.

Spanish Don Bertrando (Jourdan) is sent to fetch a female doctor, Isabella (Fontaine), for his master, the seriously ill King (Hugh Morton). On the trip, he defends her from two highwaymen.

When she cures the King, he offers her anything. She asks for a husband: Bertrando. Dismayed, Bertrando agrees, but immediately after their wedding, he leaves her - having fulfilled his promise - and resumes his playboy ways. Before departing, he tells her that he will only live with her if she obtains the ring on his finger and bears him a child.

Learning that Bertrando is trying to seduce an innkeeper's daughter, Maria (Joan Collins), Isabella has the innkeeper send Bertrando a message supposedly from Maria agreeing to spend the night with him. Instead, Isabella keeps the rendezvous in the dark, unlit bedroom. She later steals Bertrando's ring while he is sleeping and leaves before her deception is revealed. Months later, she gives birth to a son. Bertrando shows up, having heard that she claims the child is his. After she tells her story, Bertrando embraces her.

When Fiametta is again critical of Boccaccio's story, he gives up and leaves. However, he returns, takes Fiametta in his arms, and kisses her. She resists at first, then gives in.

Cast

 Joan Fontaine as Fiametta / Bartolomea / Ginevra / Isabella
 Louis Jourdan as Giovanni Boccaccio / Paganino / Giulio / Don Bertrando
 Godfrey Tearle as Ricciardo / Bernabo
 Joan Collins as Pampinea / Maria
 Binnie Barnes as Contessa de Firenze / The Countess / Nerina the Chambermaid / The Old Witch
 Meinhart Maur as Sultan
 Gordon Whiting		
 Gordon Bell as Merchant
 Melissa Stribling as Girl in Villa
 Stella Riley as Girl in Villa
 Mara Lane as Girl in Villa
 Van Boolen as Captain
 Gérard Tichy
 Diaz de Mendoza		
 Carlos Villarías (as Carolos Villarias)
 Eliot Makeham as Governor of Majorca
 Marjorie Rhodes as Signora Bucca
 Noel Purcell as Father Francisco
 Hugh Morton as King
 George Bernard as Messenger
 Bert Bernard as Messenger

External links
 
 
 
 

1953 films
American anthology films
British romance films
British anthology films
The Decameron
Films based on short fiction
Films based on works by Giovanni Boccaccio
1950s romance films
RKO Pictures films
Films scored by Antony Hopkins
Films set in the 14th century
Films about writers
Films set in Italy
American romance films
Films set in Monaco
Films set in Tunisia
Cross-dressing in film
1950s English-language films
1950s American films
1950s British films